Sanjeev Kumar Maria (born 2 September 1980) is a former Indian professional footballer who played as a defender. He played in both the National Football League and I-League for Mohun Bagan, Fransa-Pax, and Salgaocar. He also represented India internationally in 2006 on five occasions.

Career
Born in Chandigarh, Maria started his career with local side AG Haryana Audit before moving to Mohun Bagan in the National Football League. He made a defensive error in an NFL match against Sporting Goa on 28 December 2003 which allowed the match to end 2–2. After the season ended, Maria signed with Fransa-Pax. He stayed with the Goan side for a season before returning to Mohun Bagan and staying with the side for four seasons. While with the Kolkata club, Maria also represented West Bengal in the Santosh Trophy. He was part of the West Bengal side which were defeated in the final of the Santosh Trophy by Punjab on 25 October 2006.

Before the 2009–10 season, it was announced that Maria had signed with Salgaocar. He stayed with the Goan side for a season before ending his career with Peerless in the Calcutta Football League.

International
Maria represented India internationally five times in 2006.

Career statistics

International

References

1980 births
Living people
Indian footballers
Mohun Bagan AC players
Fransa-Pax FC players
Salgaocar FC players
Association football defenders
Footballers from Chandigarh
I-League players
India international footballers
Peerless SC players